Beijing Oriental Yuhong Waterproof Technology Co., Ltd., commonly abbreviated as Oriental Yuhong, is a waterproof system service provider,  founded in 1998. It prevailingly produces water-based waterproof coatings for applications. After being approved by the China Securities Regulatory Commission for IPO,  it officially went public on the Shenzhen Stock Exchange on September 10, 2008.

History 
In June 2013, Oriental Yuhong landed in Trinidad and Tobago through establishing a manufacturing plant with Lake Asphalt.

In January 2016, Oriental Yuhong landed at incubator of Ben Franklin TechVentures in Pennsylvania, United States.

In July 2017, it jointly established Zhongguancun Bank, a private bank granted by the China Banking Regulatory Commission.

References 

2008 initial public offerings
Companies listed on the Shenzhen Stock Exchange